Zo or ZO may refer to:

Arts and entertainment
 Kamen Rider ZO, a 1993 Japanese tokusatsu movie
 Zo (album), an album by jazz pianist Matthew Shipp

Ethnography
 Zo people, a group of indigenous tribe in Burma and northeast India
 Zou people, one of those tribes
 Zo language, the language spoken by the Zo people
 Zogam or Zoland, the land of Zo people, also Chin State, Mizoram State, Manipur State, and Nagaland

People
 Alonzo Mourning (born 1970), American retired National Basketball Association player
 Lorenzo Charles (1963-2011), American basketball player
 Achille Zo (1826–1901), French painter
 Mat Zo (born 1990), UK trance artist
 Zo d'Axa, (1864–1930), French journalist, writer, and adventurer
Lonzo Ball, (born 1997), National Basketball Association player for the Los Angeles Lakers

Other uses
 Zo (bot), artificial intelligence chatbot developed by Microsoft 
 ZO sex-determination system, chromosomal system in biology determining the sex of some moth species
 ZO, heterogametic female designation under this system
 Renault Zo, a car introduced in 1998
 Zone occupée, the partition of France occupied by German troops during the initial years of World War II

See also
 Zo'é language, a language originating in Brazil
 Dzo, a male hybrid of a yak and a domesticated cow
 Zoo (disambiguation)
 Zou (disambiguation)

Language and nationality disambiguation pages